The 2021–22 Cleveland Cavaliers season was the 52nd season of the franchise in the National Basketball Association (NBA). The regular season for the league began in the month of October and featured the typical 82-game schedule, returning to its typical format. In the previous season, the league started in the month of December and featured only 72 games due to the ongoing COVID-19 pandemic. The Cavaliers had the third pick in the 2021 NBA draft, and selected Evan Mobley out of the University of Southern California. The NBA announced that the All-Star Game will be played at the Rocket Mortgage FieldHouse in Cleveland, which was held February 20, 2022. The Cavaliers matched their previous win total of 22 on January 7, 2022, improving to 22–17. The Cavaliers clinched their first winning season without LeBron James since 1998 and their first winning season since 2018 with a 107–101 win over the Orlando Magic on March 28, 2022. The Cavaliers qualified for the play-in tournament, but failed to qualify for the playoffs for the fourth consecutive season after losing to both the Brooklyn Nets and Atlanta Hawks.

Draft

With their sole selection in the 2021 NBA draft, the Cavaliers selected Evan Mobley from the University of Southern California as the third overall pick.

Roster

Standings

Division

Conference

Game log

Preseason

|-style="background:#fcc;"
| 1
| October 5
| @ Chicago
| 
| Collin Sexton (14)
| Jarrett Allen (10)
| Ricky Rubio (6)
| United Center11,777
| 0–1
|-style="background:#cfc;"
| 2
| October 6
| @ Atlanta
| 
| Collin Sexton (19)
| Evan Mobley (12)
| Darius Garland (7)
| State Farm Arena11,158
| 1–1
|-style="background:#fcc;"
| 3
| October 8
| Indiana
| 
| Ricky Rubio (14)
| Lauri Markkanen (7)
| Dean Wade (4)
| Rocket Mortgage FieldHouse10,024
| 1–2
|-style="background:#fcc;"
| 4
| October 10
| Chicago
| 
| Lauri Markkanen (18)
| Evan Mobley (10)
| Ricky Rubio (9)
| Rocket Mortgage FieldHouse10,003
| 1–3
|-style="background:#cfc;"
| 5
| October 15
| @ Indiana
| 
| Cedi Osman (14)
| Lamar Stevens (8)
| Darius Garland (4)
| Gainbridge Fieldhouse6,028
| 2–3

Regular season

|-style="background:#fcc;"
| 1
| October 20
| @ Memphis
| 
| Jarrett Allen (25)
| Markkanen, Mobley (9)
| Darius Garland (12)
| FedExForum15,975
| 0–1
|-style="background:#fcc;"
| 2
| October 22
| Charlotte
| 
| Collin Sexton (33)
| Kevin Love (11)
| Ricky Rubio (10)
| Rocket Mortgage FieldHouse17,116
| 0–2
|-style="background:#cfc;"
| 3
| October 23
| Atlanta
|  
| Ricky Rubio (23)
| Jarrett Allen (14)
| Ricky Rubio (8)
| Rocket Mortgage FieldHouse16,846
| 1–2
|-style="background:#cfc;"
| 4
| October 25
| @ Denver
| 
| Kevin Love (22)
| Jarrett Allen (16)
| Ricky Rubio (8)
| Ball Arena14,221
| 2–2
|-style="background:#cfc;"
| 5
| October 27
| @ L.A. Clippers
|  
| Collin Sexton (26)
| Love, Mobley (10)
| Darius Garland (6)
| Staples Center13,276
| 3–2
|-style="background:#fcc;"
| 6
| October 29
| @ L.A. Lakers
| 
| Evan Mobley (23)
| Jarrett Allen (9)
| Darius Garland (11)
| Staples Center18,997 
| 3–3
|-style="background:#fcc;"
| 7
| October 30
| @ Phoenix
| 
| Cedi Osman (20)
| Kevin Love (12)
| Darius Garland (5)
| Footprint Center14,516
| 3–4

|-style="background:#cfc;"
| 8
| November 1
| @ Charlotte
| 
| Lauri Markkanen (21)
| Jarrett Allen (16)
| Ricky Rubio (8)
| Spectrum Center13,889
| 4–4
|-style="background:#cfc;"
| 9
| November 3
| Portland
| 
| Jarrett Allen (24)
| Jarrett Allen (17)
| Darius Garland (10)
| Rocket Mortgage FieldHouse16,231
| 5–4
|-style="background:#cfc;"
| 10
| November 5
| @ Toronto
| 
| Darius Garland (21)
| Jarrett Allen (15)
| Darius Garland (8)
| Scotiabank Arena19,800
| 6–4
|-style="background:#cfc;"
| 11
| November 7
| @ New York
| 
| Ricky Rubio (37)
| Jarrett Allen (17)
| Ricky Rubio (10)
| Madison Square Garden19,040
| 7–4
|-style="background:#fcc;"
| 12
| November 10
| Washington
| 
| Ricky Rubio (20)
| Jarrett Allen (10)
| Ricky Rubio (5)
| Rocket Mortgage FieldHouse18,056
| 7–5
|-style="background:#cfc;"
| 13
| November 12
| Detroit
| 
| Darius Garland (21)
| Isaac Okoro (9)
| Ricky Rubio (9)
| Rocket Mortgage FieldHouse17,095
| 8–5
|-style="background:#cfc;"
| 14
| November 13
| Boston
| 
| Darius Garland (22)
| Evan Mobley (9)
| Darius Garland (6)
| Rocket Mortgage FieldHouse19,432
| 9–5
|-style="background:#fcc;"
| 15
| November 15
| Boston
| 
| Ricky Rubio (28)
| Evan Mobley (9)
| Mobley, Osman (5)
| Rocket Mortgage FieldHouse17,186
| 9–6
|-style="background:#fcc;"
| 16
| November 17
| @ Brooklyn
| 
| Ricky Rubio (25)
| Ed Davis (11)
| Darius Garland (6)
| Barclays Center16,922
| 9–7
|-style="background:#fcc;"
| 17
| November 18
| Golden State
| 
| Darius Garland (25)
| Ed Davis (14)
| Darius Garland (6)
| Rocket Mortgage FieldHouse 19,432
| 9–8
|-style="background:#fcc;"
| 18
| November 22
| Brooklyn
| 
| Darius Garland (24)
| Jarrett Allen (15)
| Darius Garland (11)
| Rocket Mortgage FieldHouse17,387
| 9–9
|-style="background:#fcc;"
| 19
| November 24
| Phoenix
| 
| Jarrett Allen (25)
| Allen, Markkanen (11)
| Darius Garland (7)
| Rocket Mortgage FieldHouse18,055
| 9–10
|-style="background:#cfc;"
| 20
| November 27
| Orlando
| 
| Darius Garland (26)
| Jarrett Allen (11)
| Darius Garland (11)
| Rocket Mortgage FieldHouse18,248
| 10–10
|-style="background:#cfc;"
| 21
| November 29
| @ Dallas
| 
| Jarrett Allen (28)
| Jarrett Allen (14)
| Darius Garland (9)
| American Airlines Center19,229
| 11–10

|-style="background:#cfc;"
| 22
| December 1
| @ Miami
| 
| Kevin Love (22)
| Allen, Mobley (11)
| Darius Garland (7)
| FTX Arena19,600
| 12–10
|-style="background:#cfc;"
| 23
| December 3
| @ Washington
| 
| Darius Garland (32)
| Jarrett Allen (13)
| Darius Garland (10)
| Capital One Arena17,227
| 13–10
|-style="background:#fcc;"
| 24
| December 5
| Utah
| 
| Darius Garland (31)
| Evan Mobley (12)
| Darius Garland (5)
| Rocket Mortgage FieldHouse18,113
| 13–11
|-style="background:#fcc;"
| 25
| December 6
| @ Milwaukee
| 
| Jarrett Allen (25)
| Jarrett Allen (9)
| Garland, Rubio (9)
| Fiserv Forum17,341
| 13–12
|-style="background:#cfc;"
| 26
| December 8
| Chicago
| 
| Darius Garland (24)
| Jarrett Allen (12)
| Ricky Rubio (9)
| Rocket Mortgage FieldHouse17,707
| 14–12
|-style="background:#cfc;"
| 27
| December 10
| @ Minnesota
| 
| Jarrett Allen (21)
| Kevin Love (13)
| Darius Garland (12)
| Target Center15,694
| 15–12
|-style="background:#cfc;"
| 28
| December 11
| Sacramento
| 
| Isaac Okoro (20)
| Evan Mobley (15)
| Darius Garland (13)
| Rocket Mortgage FieldHouse19,432
| 16–12
|-style="background:#cfc;"
| 29
| December 13
| Miami
| 
| Kevin Love (23)
| Kevin Love (9)
| Ricky Rubio (7)
| Rocket Mortgage FieldHouse17,401
| 17–12
|-style="background:#cfc;"
| 30
| December 15
| Houston
| 
| Darius Garland (21)
| Dean Wade (10)
| Ricky Rubio (12)
| Rocket Mortgage FieldHouse17,131
| 18–12
|-style="background:#cfc;"
| 31
| December 18
| @ Milwaukee
| 
| Cedi Osman (23)
| Kevin Love (7)
| Ricky Rubio (10)
| Fiserv Forum17,341
| 19–12
|-style="background:#ccc;"
| –
| December 19
| @ Atlanta
| colspan="6" | Postponed (COVID-19) (Makeup date: March 31)
|-style="background:#fcc;"
| 32
| December 22
| @ Boston
| 
| Darius Garland (28)
| Kevin Love (12)
| Garland, Rubio (6)
| TD Garden19,156
| 19–13
|-style="background:#cfc;"
| 33
| December 26
| Toronto
| 
| Garland, Love (22)
| Love, Valentine (9)
| Darius Garland (8)
| Rocket Mortgage FieldHouse19,432
| 20–13
|-style="background:#fcc;"
| 34
| December 28
| @ New Orleans
|  
| Ricky Rubio (27)
| Ricky Rubio (13)
| Ricky Rubio (9)
| Smoothie King Center15,835
| 20–14
|-style="background:#fcc;"
| 35
| December 30
| @ Washington
| 
| Kevin Love (24)
| Kevin Love (11)
| Kevin Pangos (6)
| Capital One Arena15,637
| 20–15
|-style="background:#fcc;"
| 36
| December 31
| Atlanta
| 
| Kevin Love (35)
| Kevin Love (11)
| Brandon Goodwin (6)
| Rocket Mortgage FieldHouse17,745
| 20–16
|-

|-style="background:#cfc;"
| 37
| January 2
| Indiana
| 
| Evan Mobley (24)
| Jarrett Allen (11)
| Brandon Goodwin (5)
| Rocket Mortgage FieldHouse17,808
| 21–16
|-style="background:#fcc;"
| 38
| January 4
| Memphis
| 
| Darius Garland (27)
| Jarrett Allen (12)
| Darius Garland (10)
| Rocket Mortgage FieldHouse18,178
| 21–17
|-style="background:#cfc;"
| 39
| January 7
| @ Portland
| 
| Darius Garland (26)
| Jarrett Allen (13)
| Darius Garland (6)
| Moda Center16,708
| 22–17
|-style="background:#fcc;"
| 40
| January 9
| @ Golden State
| 
| Lamar Stevens (17)
| Allen, Love (7)
| Rajon Rondo (5)
| Chase Center18,064
| 22–18
|-style="background:#cfc;"
| 41
| January 10
| @ Sacramento
| 
| Allen, Love (18)
| Jarrett Allen (17)
| Darius Garland (11)
| Golden 1 Center12,110
| 23–18
|-style="background:#cfc;"
| 42
| January 12
| @ Utah
| 
| Lamar Stevens (23)
| Darius Garland (10)
| Darius Garland (15)
| Vivint Arena18,306
| 24–18
|-style="background:#cfc;"
| 43
| January 14
| @ San Antonio
| 
| Darius Garland (32)
| Jarrett Allen (16) 
| Darius Garland (8) 
| AT&T Center12,160
| 25–18
|-style="background:#cfc;"
| 44
| January 15
| @ Oklahoma City
| 
| Darius Garland (27) 
| Jarrett Allen (13)
| Darius Garland (18) 
| Paycom Center15,284
| 26–18
|-style="background:#cfc;"
| 45
| January 17
| Brooklyn
| 
| Darius Garland (22) 
| Jarrett Allen (10)
| Darius Garland (12) 
| Rocket Mortgage FieldHouse18,105
| 27–18
|-style="background:#fcc;"
| 46
| January 19
| @ Chicago
| 
| Lauri Markkanen (28)
| Jarrett Allen (10)
| Darius Garland (12) 
| United Center20,824
| 27–19
|-style="background:#cfc;"
| 47
| January 22
| Oklahoma City
| 
| Darius Garland (23) 
| Evan Mobley (17)
| Darius Garland (11) 
| Rocket Mortgage FieldHouse19,432
| 28–19
|-style="background:#cfc;"
| 48
| January 24
| New York
|  
| Kevin Love (20)
| Evan Mobley (12)
| Darius Garland (12)  
| Rocket Mortgage FieldHouse17,321
| 29–19
|-style="background:#cfc;"
| 49
| January 26
| Milwaukee
|  
| Kevin Love (25)
| Jarrett Allen (10)
| Darius Garland (8)
| Rocket Mortgage FieldHouse18,904
| 30–19
|-style="background:#fcc;"
| 50
| January 30
| @ Detroit
|  
| Darius Garland (24)
| Allen, Mobley (9)
| Darius Garland (7)
| Little Caesars Arena16,811
| 30–20
|-style="background:#cfc;"
| 51
| January 31
| New Orleans
|  
| Brandon Goodwin (21)
| Kevin Love (11)
| Cedi Osman (12)
| Rocket Mortgage FieldHouse17,637
| 31–20
|-

|-style="background:#fcc;"
| 52
| February 2
| @ Houston
|  
| Evan Mobley (29)
| Kevin Love (13)
| Brandon Goodwin (8)
| Toyota Center14,163
| 31–21
|-style="background:#cfc;"
| 53
| February 4
| @ Charlotte
|  
| Jarrett Allen (29)
| Jarrett Allen (22)
| Brandon Goodwin (9)
| Spectrum Center17,733
| 32–21
|-style="background:#cfc;"
| 54
| February 6
| Indiana
| 
| Cedi Osman (22)
| Jarrett Allen (17)
| Rajon Rondo (12)
| Rocket Mortgage FieldHouse19,432
| 33–21
|-style="background:#cfc;"
| 55
| February 9
| San Antonio
| 
| Darius Garland (27)
| Jarrett Allen (14)
| Darius Garland (6)
| Rocket Mortgage FieldHouse19,432
| 34–21
|-style="background:#cfc;"
| 56
| February 11
| @ Indiana
| 
| Allen, LeVert (22)
| Jarrett Allen (14)
| Rajon Rondo (6)
| Gainbridge Fieldhouse15,075
| 35–21
|-style="background:#fcc;"
| 57
| February 12
| @ Philadelphia
| 
| Darius Garland (27)
| Evan Mobley (8)
| Caris LeVert (6)
| Wells Fargo Center21,057
| 35–22
|-style="background:#fcc;"
| 58
| February 15
| @ Atlanta
| 
| Darius Garland (30) 
| Evan Mobley (10)
| Darius Garland (8)
| State Farm Arena15,947
| 35–23
|-style="background:#fcc;"
| 59
| February 24
| @ Detroit
| 
| Lauri Markkanen (22)
| Allen, Mobley (8)
| Rajon Rondo (9)
| Little Caesars Arena15,622
| 35–24
|-style="background:#cfc;"
| 60
| February 26
| Washington
| 
| Lauri Markkanen (23)
| Jarrett Allen (14)
| Brandon Goodwin (6)
| Rocket Mortgage FieldHouse19,432
| 36–24
|-style="background:#fcc;"
| 61
| February 28
| Minnesota
| 
| Kevin Love (26)
| Evan Mobley (10)
| Brandon Goodwin (12)
| Rocket Mortgage FieldHouse18,421
| 36–25
|-

|-style="background:#fcc;"
| 62
| March 2
| Charlotte
| 
| Darius Garland (33)
| Jarrett Allen (11)
| Kevin Love (5)
| Rocket Mortgage FieldHouse19,019
| 36–26
|-style="background:#fcc;"
| 63
| March 4
| @ Philadelphia
| 
| Darius Garland (26)
| Kevin Love (10)
| Darius Garland (19)
| Wells Fargo Center21,391
| 36–27
|-style="background:#cfc;"
| 64
| March 6
| Toronto
| 
| Lauri Markkanen (22)
| Evan Mobley (17)
| Darius Garland (10)
| Rocket Mortgage FieldHouse19,432
| 37–27
|-style="background:#cfc;"
| 65
| March 8
| @ Indiana
| 
| Darius Garland (41)
| Evan Mobley (12)
| Darius Garland (13)
| Gainbridge Fieldhouse14,066
| 38–27
|-style="background:#fcc;"
| 66
| March 11
| @ Miami
|   
| Darius Garland (24)
| Evan Mobley (12)
| Darius Garland (10)
| FTX Arena19,600
| 38–28
|-style="background:#fcc;"
| 67
| March 12
| @ Chicago
| 
| Darius Garland (25) 
| Kevin Love (11)
| Darius Garland (7) 
| United Center21,727
| 38–29
|-style="background:#cfc;"
| 68
| March 14
| L.A. Clippers
| 
| Evan Mobley (30)
| Love, Markkanen (9)
| Darius Garland (13)
| Rocket Mortgage FieldHouse18,742
| 39–29
|-style="background:#fcc;"
| 69
| March 16
| Philadelphia
| 
| Darius Garland (22)
| Evan Mobley (9)
| Garland, LeVert (7)
| Rocket Mortgage FieldHouse19,432
| 39–30
|-style="background:#cfc;"
| 70
| March 18
| Denver
| 
| Lauri Markkanen (31)
| Evan Mobley (11)
| Darius Garland (14)
| Rocket Mortgage FieldHouse19,432
| 40–30
|-style="background:#cfc;"
| 71
| March 19
| Detroit
| 
| Darius Garland (24)
| Evan Mobley (11)
| Darius Garland (12)
| Rocket Mortgage FieldHouse19,432
| 41–30
|-style="background:#fcc;"
| 72
| March 21
| L.A. Lakers
| 
| Darius Garland (29)
| Lauri Markkanen (9)
| Darius Garland (17)
| Rocket Mortgage FieldHouse19,432
| 41–31
|-style="background:#fcc;"
| 73
| March 24
| @ Toronto
| 
| Lauri Markkanen (20)
| Kevin Love (10)
| Darius Garland (10)
| Scotiabank Arena19,800
| 41–32
|-style="background:#fcc;"
| 74
| March 26
| Chicago
| 
| Darius Garland (28)
| Evan Mobley (11)
| Darius Garland (5)
| Rocket Mortgage FieldHouse19,432
| 41–33
|-style="background:#cfc;"
| 75
| March 28
| Orlando
| 
| Darius Garland (25)
| Dylan Windler (9)
| Darius Garland (12)
| Rocket Mortgage FieldHouse19,432
| 42–33
|-style="background:#fcc;"
| 76
| March 30
| Dallas
| 
| Caris LeVert (32)
| Moses Brown (9)
| Darius Garland (10)
| Rocket Mortgage FieldHouse19,432
| 42–34
|-style="background:#fcc;"
| 77
| March 31
| @ Atlanta
| 
| Cedi Osman (21)
| Moses Brown (13)
| Darius Garland (8)
| State Farm Arena17,491
| 42–35
|-

|-style="background:#cfc;"
| 78
| April 2
| @ New York
| 
| Darius Garland (24)
| Moses Brown (13)
| Darius Garland (13)
| Madison Square Garden19,812
| 43–35
|-style="background:#fcc;"
| 79
| April 3
| Philadelphia
| 
| Darius Garland (23)
| Moses Brown (12)
| Caris LeVert (7)
| Rocket Mortgage FieldHouse19,432
| 43–36
|-style="background:#fcc;"
| 80
| April 5
| @ Orlando
| 
| Darius Garland (27)
| Kevin Love (13)
| Darius Garland (10)
| Amway Center16,897
| 43–37
|-style="background:#fcc;"
| 81
| April 8
| @ Brooklyn
| 
| Darius Garland (31)
| Kevin Love (9)
| Rajon Rondo (5)
| Barclays Center18,169
| 43–38
|-style="background:#cfc;"
| 82
| April 10
| Milwaukee
| 
| Kevin Love (32)
| Love, Mobley (10)
| Rajon Rondo (13)
| Rocket Mortgage FieldHouse19,432
| 44–38

Play-in

|- style="background:#fcc;"
| 1
| April 12
| @ Brooklyn
| 
| Darius Garland (34)
| Kevin Love (13)
| Rajon Rondo (9)
| Barclays Center17,732
| 0–1
|- style="background:#fcc;"
| 2
| April 15
| Atlanta
| 
| Lauri Markkanen (26)
| Markkanen, Mobley (8)
| Darius Garland (9)
| Rocket Mortgage FieldHouse19,432
| 0–2

Transactions

Trades

Free agency

Re-signed

Additions

References

Cleveland Cavaliers seasons
Cleveland
Cleveland Cavaliers
Cleveland Cavaliers